Margaret I (c. 1145 - died 15 November 1194) was the countess of Flanders suo jure from 1191 to her death.

Early life
Margaret was the daughter of Count Thierry of Flanders and Sibylla of Anjou. In 1160 she married Count Ralph II of Vermandois (son of Ralph I). Due to his leprosy, the marriage could not be consummated and remained childless. He died of leprosy in 1167 without issue. In 1169 she married Count Baldwin V of Hainaut, a scion of the House of Flanders.

Countship
In 1191, Margaret's brother Count Philip I of Flanders died childless, and she as his heir claimed the county of Flanders with the support of her husband.  Her claims was questioned by the king of France who, with support of Ghent, declared Flanders escheated to the crown due to the lack of male heirs, a problem that was not solved until the Treaty of Arras by the mediation of the archbishop of Reims. They met some unrest among the nobility of the area, foremost by her brother's widow, Theresa of Portugal, who was given extensive dower lands in the coastal and southern Flanders where she provoked considerable unrest by high taxation.  

The right of Margaret and her husband to the County of Flanders was not finally acknowledged until 1 March 1192. As countess, she objected to all foreign legal independence in her lands, and accordingly, she prevented the Hanse merchants living in Bruges from acquiring a separate quarter and rights for themselves in the port of Damme.  

Margaret died on 15 November 1194; as her husband had become count of Flanders only by marriage, he could not remain sole count, and Margaret was succeeded by their son Baldwin IX.

Issue
Margaret and Baldwin had:
 Isabella, married Philip II of France
 Baldwin IX of Flanders (1171–1205), also count of Flanders and Latin Emperor
 Yolanda (1175–1219), married Peter of Courtenay, Latin Emperor
 Philip I of Namur (1175–1212)
 Henry of Flanders (1176–1216), Latin emperor of Constantinople
Sybille (1179–9 January 1217), married c. 1197 Guichard IV, Sire de Beaujeu. They had a daughter, Agnes of Beaujeu.
 Eustace (d. 1219), regent of the Kingdom of Thessalonica
 Godfrey

References

Sources

External link

Flanders, Margaret I of
Flanders, Margaret I of
House of Metz
Countesses of Flanders
Countesses of Hainaut
Flanders, Countess of, Margaret I
Year of birth uncertain
12th-century women rulers
12th-century women from the county of Flanders